Balak Dhruv is a 1974 Bollywood drama film directed by Himmat Dave.

Cast
Master Satyajeet ... Bhakta Dhruv
Jayshree Gadkar as Suniti 
Jeevan as Narad Muni
Master Alankar as Uttam
Mahipal
Bhagwan  
Abhi Bhattacharya as Uttanapada
S.N. Tripathi
Sathyajyoti as Suruchi

Soundtrack
All songs were composed by Govind–Naresh and penned by Madan Bharti.

"Hari Sumeeran Kar Lije Manva" (version 1) - Mohammed Rafi
"Hari Sumeeran Kar Lije Manva" (version 1) - Mohammed Rafi
"Hriday Mein Hazaaron" - N/A
"Le Le Barat Bhole Baba" - Aparna Mayekar, Krishna Kalle
"Naagan Hu Main Chandan Ban Ki" - Asha Bhosle
"He Jag Ke Bhagwan Aao Aao Mujhe Apnao" - Asha Bhosle
"Ruk Jaao Naag Devta" - Krishna Kalle

External links
 

1974 films
1970s Hindi-language films
1974 drama films
Hindu mythological films